The 1928 Montana gubernatorial election took place on November 6, 1928. Incumbent Governor of Montana John E. Erickson, who was first elected governor in 1924, ran for re-election. Erickson only narrowly won the Democratic primary against future Governor Roy E. Ayers, and advanced to the general election, where he was opposed by U.S. Attorney Wellington D. Rankin, the former Attorney General of Montana. Although Herbert Hoover carried the state in a landslide in the presidential election that year, Erickson won re-election to his second term as governor in a landslide over Rankin.

Democratic primary

Candidates
John E. Erickson, incumbent Governor of Montana
Roy E. Ayers, former Associate Justice of the

Supreme Court of Montana

Results

Republican primary

Candidates
Wellington D. Rankin, U.S. Attorney for the District of Montana and former Attorney General of Montana
Lee Dennis, former chairman of the Montana Railroad and Public Service Commission
W. J. Paul, former state senator
J. W. Walker

Results

General election

Results

References

Montana
Gubernatorial
1928
November 1928 events in the United States